Andrew Strahan (1749–1831) was an MP and printer who served as the King's Printer.

Biography 
Andrew Strahan was the youngest son of William Strahan (1715–1785), and carried on his father's business with success, becoming one of the joint patentees, with John Reeves and George Eyre as the King's Printer. He retired in 1819. Between 1796 and 1820 he sat in Parliament successively for Newport, Wareham, Carlow Borough, Aldeburgh, and New Romney.

Strahan was a close friend of the inventor John Dickinson (1782–1869) and his family. He recommended the young John Dickinson as an apprentice to the stationer Thomas Harrison in London and supported him financially on several occasions, amongst others to establish himself as a paper trader in 1805 and to set up a paper producing company in 1809, which later evolved into the leading paper and stationery company John Dickinson & Co. Ltd.

Strahan died on 25 August 1831 leaving an enormous fortune. In his will he bequeathed £1,000 to the Royal Literary Fund, and £1,225 to the Stationers' Company but Strahan also remembered all the Dickinson family, among them John Dickinson, who received £4,000.

References

Sources 
 Cochrane, J. A., Dr Johnson's Printer : The Life of William Strahan, 1964

Attribution

External links 
 

English printers
Members of the Parliament of Great Britain for English constituencies
Members of the Parliament of the United Kingdom for English constituencies
Members of the Parliament of the United Kingdom for County Carlow constituencies (1801–1922)
1749 births
1831 deaths
British MPs 1796–1800
UK MPs 1801–1802
UK MPs 1802–1806
UK MPs 1806–1807
UK MPs 1807–1812
UK MPs 1812–1818
UK MPs 1818–1820